Nantgarw (Low Level) Halt railway station was a halt on the now-disused Cardiff Railway.

History
The halt opened along with the line in 1911. It was named Nantgarw Halt, even though there was already a halt with this name on the Pontypridd, Caerphilly and Newport Railway, which had opened in 1904.

After the Great Western Railway took over the line in the 1920s, the halt was renamed Nantgarw (Low Level) Halt to distinguish it from the PC&NR station in 1924. An additional platform was opened on the down side of the line in 1928, and a passing loop was added at the same time. Despite these modifications, the halt closed to all traffic in 1931.

After closure
The footpaths and one nameboard remained in 1957, but these traces of the halt are long gone. The line, slightly modified to serve Nantgarw Colliery lasted in use until the 1980s. The whole site of the station (and much else) is now covered by a business park.

Notes

Railway stations in Great Britain opened in 1911
Railway stations in Great Britain closed in 1931
Disused railway stations in Rhondda Cynon Taf
Former Cardiff Railway stations